The Personidae are a family of sea snails, marine gastropod molluscs in the order Littorinimorpha.

Taxonomy 
 Distorsio Röding, 1798
 † Kotakaia Beu, 1988 
 Personopsis Beu, 1988
Synonyms
 Calcarella Souleyet, 1850: synonym of Distorsio Röding, 1798
 Distorta Perry, 1811: synonym of Distorsio Röding, 1798
 Distortrix Link, 1807: synonym of Distorsio Röding, 1798 (objective synonym of Distorsio)
 Persona Montfort, 1810: synonym of Distorsio Röding, 1798 (objective synonym of Distoriso)

References

External links
 The Taxonomicon
 Gray, J. E. (1854). On the division of ctenobranchous gasteropodous Mollusca into larger groups and families. Proceedings of the Zoological Society of London. (1853) 21: 32-44
  Strong E.E., Puillandre N., Beu A.G., Castelin M. & Bouchet P. (2019). Frogs and tuns and tritons – A molecular phylogeny and revised family classification of the predatory gastropod superfamily Tonnoidea (Caenogastropoda). Molecular Phylogenetics and Evolution. 130: 18-34
 Beu, A. G. (1988). Taxonomy of gastropods of the families Ranellidae (= Cymatiidae) and Bursidae. Part 5. Early history of the families, with four new genera and recognition of the family Personidae. Saito Ho-on Kai Special Publication. (Prof. T. Kotaka Commemorative volume): 69-96
 Beu A.G. (1998). Résultats des Campagnes MUSORSTOM: 19. Indo-West Pacific Ranellidae, Bursidae and Personidae (Mollusca: Gastropoda), a monograph of the New Caledonian fauna and revisions of related taxa. Mémoires du Muséum National d'Histoire Naturelle. 178: 1-255.

 
Taxa named by John Edward Gray